The Best of the Eighties is a compilation album by German heavy metal band Grave Digger released in 1993. It consists of tracks from their first three albums from the 1980s, disregarding their fourth record "Stronger Than Ever," as well as a few rare tracks.

Track listing 

1993 greatest hits albums
Grave Digger (band) albums
Noise Records compilation albums